Sumoor is a village and tehsil in the Leh district of Ladakh, India.
  
Historically this village seems to be on the ancient trade route connecting Khasgar in China to Ladakh in India. There is an ancient fort at the top of the hill just above the monastery. The monastery is one of the biggest in the Nubra Valley, which was founded by Lama Tsultim Nima around 1830s. There is huge rock carving dating from the8-9th century AD. The village is the largest in terms of population in the whole Saichen belt. During the long winters people of the village observe various traditional cultural practices. 

Sumoor also has sand dunes at the end of the village, where tourists can have camel rides.

Demographics
According to the 2011 census of India, Sumoor has 164 households. The effective literacy rate (i.e. the literacy rate of population excluding children aged 6 and below) is 66.14%.

References

Villages in Nubra tehsil